Dragan Antanasijević (born 19 July 1987) is a Serbian professional footballer who plays as a defensive midfielder for Canadian Soccer League club BGHC 1.

Honours
BASK
 Serbian First League: 2010–11

External links
 
 
 

Kategoria Superiore players
Association football midfielders
Expatriate footballers in Albania
Expatriate footballers in France
Expatriate footballers in Hungary
FK Banat Zrenjanin players
FK BASK players
FK BSK Borča players
FK Palilulac Beograd players
FK Partizani Tirana players
FK Radnički Beograd players
FK Sloga Petrovac na Mlavi players
Footballers from Belgrade
Kaposvári Rákóczi FC players
Nemzeti Bajnokság I players
Serbian expatriate footballers
Serbian expatriate sportspeople in Albania
Serbian expatriate sportspeople in France
Serbian expatriate sportspeople in Hungary
Serbian First League players
Serbian footballers
Tarbes Pyrénées Football players
Trélissac FC players
1987 births
Living people